Rumpo is a village in Vormsi Parish, Lääne County in western Estonia.

References

 

Villages in Lääne County